Brampton South is a federal electoral district in the Peel Region of Ontario.

Brampton South was created by the 2012 federal electoral boundaries redistribution and was legally defined in the 2013 representation order. It came into effect upon the call of the 42nd Canadian federal election, scheduled for October 2015. It was created out of the electoral district of Brampton West.

Demographics 
According to the 2021 Canada Census

Ethnic groups: 49.2% South Asian, 24.4% White, 11.2% Black, 3.5% Filipino, 1.6% Latin American, 1.6% Southeast Asian, 1.5% Chinese, 1.2% Arab

Languages: 44.4% English, 18.8% Punjabi, 3.7% Urdu, 3.2% Gujarati, 3.0% Hindi, 2.1% Portuguese, 1.6% Tagalog, 1.6% Tamil, 1.4% Spanish

Religions: 37.4% Christian (18.5% Catholic, 2.4% Pentecostal, 1.9% Anglican, 1.4% United Church, 13.2% Other), 21.9% Sikh, 17.1% Hindu, 9.1% Muslim, 1.3% Buddhist, 12.6% None

Median income: $35,600 (2020)

Average income: $45,920 (2020)

Members of Parliament

This riding has elected the following Members of Parliament:

Election results

References

Ontario federal electoral districts
Politics of Brampton
2013 establishments in Ontario